Bakerton may refer to:

Bakerton, Kentucky, an unincorporated community in Cumberland County
Bakerton, Tennessee, an unincorporated community in Clay County
Bakerton, West Virginia, an unincorporated community in Jefferson County

See also
The Bakerton Group